Artin Jelow (also Atin Jilao) is a village in Badakhshan Province in north-eastern Afghanistan. It is roughly 16 miles southeast of Rostaq, Afghanistan. There is a bridge over the Kokcha River there. In the 1970s, the village population were primarily Tajiks.

References

Populated places in Argo District